Somerton is a suburb in Melbourne, Victoria, Australia,  north of Melbourne's Central Business District, located within the City of Hume local government area. Somerton recorded a population of 6 at the 2021 census.

Somerton is predominantly an industrial and business suburb, and has a number of industrial parks, including the Austrak Business Park, Somerton Logistics Centre and the Northgate Distribution Centre. It is bounded by Patullos Lane in the north, the Merri Creek in the east, Somerton Road/Cooper Street in the south and the Craigieburn/North East railway lines in the west.

History

The origin of Somerton's name is unclear, however records from 1847 show a "Summerton Inn". It may have also been named after Somers Town in London, England.

Somerton Post Office first opened on 1 January 1854 and closed in 1864. It reopened in 1892, some time after the railway line opened and again closed in 1966. In 1994, the Somerton Business and Delivery Centre opened.

Transport

Bus
Two bus routes service Somerton:

 : Craigieburn station – Broadmeadows station via Upfield station. Operated by Broadmeadows Bus Service.
  : Frankston station – Melbourne Airport. Operated by Kinetic Melbourne.

Train
Roxburgh Park station, on the Craigieburn line, and Upfield station, on the Upfield line, are the nearest railway stations to Somerton. Somerton railway station opened in 1881 and closed to passengers in 1960. A crossing loop on the Melbourne – Sydney standard gauge line and an adjacent rail yard retain the Somerton name.

See also
 City of Whittlesea – Parts of Somerton were previously within this local government area.
 Shire of Bulla – Parts of Somerton were previously within this former local government area.

References

Suburbs of Melbourne
Suburbs of the City of Hume